Steve Butland (born March 26, 1941) is a Canadian politician. He represented the Sault Ste. Marie electoral district in the House of Commons of Canada from 1988 to 1993 as a member of the New Democratic Party.

Butland was born in Sault Ste. Marie, Ontario. Before entering politics, served as principal at St. Hubert's (Catholic) elementary school from 1984 to 1988.

Following his federal defeat, Butland ran for mayor of the city of Sault Ste. Marie in a special byelection in 1996, following the controversial resignation of Joe Fratesi. He was elected, succeeding Fratesi's appointed interim replacement Michael Sanzosti, and served until 2000, when he was defeated by John Rowswell. He subsequently ran for the city council as a ward councillor in the 2003 municipal election, and was elected.

References

External links
 

Mayors of Sault Ste. Marie, Ontario
Members of the House of Commons of Canada from Ontario
New Democratic Party MPs
1941 births
Living people